2 Equulei is a double star system in the constellation of Equuleus.

The primary component of the 2 Equ pair is an F-type main sequence star. As of 2015, the secondary had an angular separation of  along a position angle of 213° from the primary. They form a common proper motion pair, two stars at approximately the same distance and moving in the same direction.

References

F-type main-sequence stars
Double stars
Equuleus
Equulei, Lambda
Durchmusterung objects
Equulei, 02
200256
103813